The Ray mine is a large copper mine located in Arizona, in the southwestern part of the United States, currently owned by Asarco, a subsidiary of Grupo México. Asarco acquired the mine from Kennecott Copper in 1986. The Ray mine has one of the largest copper reserves in the United States, with proven and probable reserves of 835.7 million tonnes of ore grading 1.73% copper, at 31 December 2018. It is located in Pinal County, near the town of Kearny. Copper from the Ray mine goes to the Hayden Smelter.

See also
 Ray, Arizona

References

External links

 
 Ray mine tour, at YouTube

Copper mines in Arizona
Geography of Pinal County, Arizona
Open-pit mines